The Principality of Brunswick-Wolfenbüttel was a principality within the Duchy of Brunswick-Lüneburg, whose history was characterised by numerous divisions and reunifications. Various dynastic lines of the House of Welf ruled Brunswick-Wolfenbüttel until the dissolution of the Holy Roman Empire in 1806. As a result of the Vienna Congress, its successor state, the Duchy of Brunswick, was created in 1814. The following is a list of all the reigning princes of Brunswick-Wolfenbüttel. Note that, in addition to being titled "Prince of Brunswick-Wolfenbüttel", all the princes (not just the reigning ones) also used the title of "Duke of Brunswick and Lüneburg".



Princes of Brunswick-Wolfenbüttel

See also 
 List of consorts of Brunswick-Wolfenbüttel
 List of the rulers of Lüneburg

Sources 
 Wilhelm Havemann: Geschichte der Lande Braunschweig und Lüneburg. 3 Bände. Nachdruck. Hirschheydt, Hanover 1974/75,  (Originalausgabe: Verlag der Dietrich'schen Buchhandlung, Göttingen 1853-1857, online near Google Books)
 Hans Patze (Begr.): Geschichte Niedersachsen. 7 Bände. Hahnsche Buchhandlung, Hanover 1977- (Veröffentlichungen der Historischen Kommission für Niedersachsen und Bremen, 36) (Übersicht des Verlags)
 Gudrun Pischke: The Landesteilungen der Welfen im Mittelalter. Lax, Hildesheim 1987, 

 
Brunswick-Wolfenbuttel
Principality of Brunswick-Wolfenbüttel
Lists of German nobility